Sangita Shrestha is a Nepalese film director, screenwriter and media presenter.

Career
Shrestha started her career on radio, later becoming a VJ for Image Channel from 2000-2004 and then at Kantipur Television, hosting the show Music Mela. She began directing music videos and a series of short films. She has directed over 70 videos, but is best known for  her short films series Katha Premka. She later based a book of short love stories on this series, Kathama Aljhiyeka Prem, released in 2016.

She appeared as a member of the jury panel for Miss Nepal 2016.

In 2018 she became a writer/director with a featured film Katha Kathmandu, based on the interconnected lives and relationships of three men living in Kathmandu.

References

External links
Rise and shine interview with Sangita Shrestha
Sangita Shrestha (Film director) On Celebrity Fun Talk with Sabi Karki Khadka
Sandarva - महिलाले बनाएको फिल्म " Katha Kathmandu Ko" किन controversial

Living people
1976 births
Nepalese artists
Nepalese women film directors
Nepalese film directors
21st-century Nepalese writers
21st-century Nepalese women writers
People from Biratnagar